Thomas Peter Lee was born on March 19, 1871, in Petroleum, West Virginia to Alexander and Martha Jane Mount Lee, Thomas Peter Lee left school at the age of sixteen and went to work in the oil fields, first in his native state and then in Ohio.  In 1903 he moved to Saratoga, Texas, where he gained employment with the newly formed Texas Company, which eventually became Texaco, and when he left that organization ten years later, he had attained the rank of general superintendent of production.  While there, however, he became friends with J.S. Cullinan, and the two, along with Emerson Francis Woodward, Will C. Hogg, and James L. Autry, joined in 1914 to form the Farmers Petroleum Company, of which Lee became president.

Life
In 1916 Lee, along with Cullinan, Woodward, and other associates, organized the American Republics Corporation that later controlled twenty-one subsidiaries involved in all facets of the oil industry: prospecting, production, refining, and transportation, as well as manufacturing ships, tank cars, and oil tools.  While serving on the board of directors, Lee also held the position of vice president in charge of production.  But things would eventually sour between Lee and Cullinan, and several years later, they headed opposing forces bitterly engaged in a stock war for control of the corporation. Cullinan not only defeated Lee in the struggle, but he put his own son Craig into Lee's position as vice president.  More than he could bear, Lee resigned and began a lucrative career in the investment field.

At the suggestion of his older brother, William Ellsworth "Bill" Lee, T. P. agreed to meet with a young wildcatter named Miles Franklin Yount, at the time a resident of Sour Lake, Texas, and afterward, T. P. invested $25,000 in the new enterprise that became the Yount-Lee Oil Company, one of the most successful independent oil producers of its day.  Yount-Lee went on to drill numerous deep-flank oil wells in both East Texas and Louisiana, and was responsible for the Second Spindletop boom begun at Beaumont, Texas on November 14, 1925.

Lee also became active in agriculture and cattle breeding on his ranch in Uvalde County.  An avid Republican, he attended several national conventions as a delegate, and in 1924 he refused the party's nomination for governor of Texas.  He twice married, the first to Elizabeth Mann on July 14, 1892.  Before she died on June 21, 1895, however, the union produced one child, Mabel Martha, who later became the wife of Talbot Frederick Rothwell.  Lee's second marriage occurred on April 24, 1900, to Essie Mable Horton of Savannah, Georgia, and together, the couple had five daughters: Maude, Ethel, Maxine, Thelma, and Marjorie. Contrary to many previously published accounts, T. P. Lee had no sons.

At age sixty-seven, Thomas Peter Lee died of a coronary occlusion on February 4, 1939, and he was buried at Glenwood Cemetery in Houston, two days later.  Lee's former home, now referred to as the Link–Lee House, and its surrounding area, became the basis of the founding of the University of St. Thomas (Houston) which still occupies the site today.  In particular, the house serves as the university's administration building.  It is listed on the National Register of Historic Places, and as a landmark of both the State of Texas and the City of Houston.

Sources
McKinley, Fred B., and Greg Riley.  Black Gold to Bluegrass: From the Oil Fields of Texas to Spindletop Farm of Kentucky.  Austin: Eakin Press, 2005.

American businesspeople in the oil industry
Businesspeople from Texas
Texas Oil Boom people
Texaco people
1871 births
1939 deaths
People from Ritchie County, West Virginia